Pterocymbium dongnaiense is a seasonal tropical forest tree species in the family Malvaceae: of the subfamily Sterculioideae (previously placed in the Sterculiaceae).  No subspecies are listed in the Catalogue of Life.  
A deciduous tree growing to about 25 m high, it is found in and adjacent to Dong Nai Province in Vietnam, where it is known as dực nang Ðồng nai.

References

External links 

Sterculioideae
Trees of Vietnam
Flora of Indo-China